Estelle Youssouffa (born 31 July 1978 in Châtenay-Malabry) is a French politician who has served as a Member of the French Parliament for Mayotte's 1st constituency since June 2022.

Biography 
Estelle Youssouffa was born in Châtenay-Malabry, France, to a Maorais military father and a metropolitan nurse mother.

She continued her schooling in Mayotte until she obtained her baccalaureate at Mamoudzou High School.

She then attended the IUT of Tours where she was trained in journalism, then continued her studies at the University of Quebec in Canada in Political Science.

She became a journalist and television host working for LCI, TV5 Monde, Al Jazeera English, BFM TV and iTélé.

Political career 
She was active during the crisis that paralyzed the island in 2018, following which she stood as a candidate in the Mayotte  legislative elections which took place in 2022, for the first constituency of Mayotte.

On 19 June 2022 she was elected deputy for Mayotte's 1st constituency, succeeding Ramlati Ali.

To the National Assembly

On June 22, 2022, she joined the Liberties, Independents, Overseas and Territories group, for which she sits on the Foreign Affairs Committee. Similarly, with six other deputies, she was appointed vice-president of the overseas delegation of the National Assembly.

References 

Living people
1978 births
Women members of the National Assembly (France)
Deputies from Mayotte
21st-century French women politicians
21st-century French politicians